Pennarhodeus brevipennatus is a species of mite in the family Rhodacaridae.

References

Rhodacaridae
Articles created by Qbugbot
Animals described in 2000